Kyodai Makes the Big Time is a 1992 Dutch drama film directed by South African film maker Ian Kerkhof (now known as Aryan Kaganof).

The film won the Golden Calf for Best Feature Film award at the 1992 Netherlands Film Festival. Janica Draisma also won the Golden Calf for Best Actress for her role in the film.

Plot
The film follows the relationship between narcistic actor Kyodai and dancer Stephanie.

References

External links 
 

Dutch drama films
1992 drama films
1992 films
1990s English-language films